Arthur Louis Aaron VC, DFM (5 March 1922 – 13 August 1943) was a Royal Air Force pilot and an English recipient of the Victoria Cross, the highest award for gallantry in the face of the enemy that can be awarded to British and Commonwealth forces. He had flown 90 operational flying hours and 19 sorties, and had also been awarded posthumously the Distinguished Flying Medal.

Early life and wartime service
Aaron was a native of Leeds, Yorkshire, and was educated at Roundhay School and Leeds School of Architecture.  When the Second World War started in 1939 Aaron joined the Air Training Corps squadron at Leeds University. The following year he volunteered to train as aircrew in the Royal Air Force.  He trained as a pilot in the United States at No. 1 British Flying Training School (BFTS) at Terrell Municipal Airport in Terrell, Texas. Aaron completed his pilot training on 15 September 1941 and returned to England to train at an Operation Conversion Unit before he joined No. 218 "Gold Coast" Squadron, flying Short Stirling heavy bombers from RAF Downham Market. 

His first operational sortie was a mining sortie in the Bay of Biscay but he was soon flying missions over Germany. On one sortie his Stirling was badly damaged but he completed his bombing run and returned to England. His actions were rewarded with a Distinguished Flying Medal.

VC action
Aaron was 21 years old, flying Stirling serial number EF452 on his 20th sortie. Nearing the target, his bomber was struck by machine gun fire. The bomber's Canadian navigator, Cornelius A. Brennan, was killed and other members of the crew were wounded.

The official citation for his VC reads:

The gunfire that hit Flight Sergeant Aaron's aircraft was thought to have been from an enemy night fighter, but may have been friendly fire from another Stirling.

Memorials

He was an 'old boy' of Roundhay School, Leeds (headmaster at the time was B.A.Farrow). There is a plaque in the main hall of the school to his memory incorporating the deed that merited the VC. On 5 March 2022 (Arthur’s 100th birthday) a Yorkshire Society blue plaque was unveiled at Roundhay School in memory of Arthur.

To mark the new Millennium, Leeds Civic Trust organised a public vote to choose a statue to mark the occasion, and to publicise the city's past heroes and heroines. Candidates included Benjamin Latrobe and Sir Henry Moore. Arthur Aaron won the vote, with Don Revie beating Joshua Tetley and Frankie Vaughan as runner-up. Located on a roundabout on the eastern edge of the city centre, close to the West Yorkshire Playhouse, the statue of Aaron was unveiled on 24 March 2001 by Malcolm Mitchem, the last survivor of the aircraft. The five-metre bronze sculpture by Graham Ibbeson takes the form of Aaron standing next to a tree, up which are climbing three children progressively representing the passage of time between 1950 and 2000, with the last a girl releasing a dove of peace, all representing the freedom his sacrifice helped ensure. There was controversy about the siting of the statue, and it was proposed to transfer it to Millennium Square outside Leeds City Museum. However, as of 2012 the statue remains on the roundabout.

Aaron's Victoria Cross and other medals are kept at Leeds City Museum.

Controversially (see below), he is commemorated at the AJEX Jewish Military Museum in Hendon, London, as one of three known Jewish Victoria Cross recipients of the Second World War (the others being Tommy Gould, Royal Navy, and John Keneally, Irish Guards). Aaron may have belonged at school or University to 319 ATC (Jewish) Squadron in Broughton, Salford, where his photograph still hangs, according to Col Martin Newman DL from the HQ Air Cadets archives.

Genealogical controversy 
Genealogical research carried out in 2018 – 2019 by David Rattee, shows Arthur Louis Aaron was baptised a Roman Catholic on 15 October 1922 at St. Mary's Church, Knaresborough, North Yorkshire. The Baptism Record is held in the archives of Ampleforth Abbey Trust. Arthur's father Benjamin gave his own religion as Church of England on his WW1 Army records. Arthur's parents, Benjamin Aaron and Rosalie Marie Aaron (nee Marney) were married on 8 February 1919 at Addingham Parish Church, near Ilkley. Benjamin Aaron was born on 29 June 1891 at 29 Dewsbury Road, Hunslet, Leeds, West Yorkshire, and baptised on 2 August 1891 at St Mary the Virgin, Hunslet Parish Church, Leeds. Birth, baptism, marriage, death, census records and other published period documentation trace the paternal surname back to William Aaron (b. 1802 Hillam, near Sherburn-in-Elmet, d. 27 September 1877) and Faith Harrison (27 August 1796 – 1 June 1866) of Sherburn, Yorkshire. Aaron was a common surname in Yorkshire well before Jewish immigration to Leeds began. 

It has been stated that Aaron's father was a Russian Jewish immigrant, even though the family denied it after Aaron was killed, giving him a Roman Catholic memorial service; it has also been claimed that he boasted of being Jewish to members of his air training colleagues in the mess in Texas on many occasions. A possible cause of the confusion, of which there is no traceable documentation, is that Aaron may have been taken to be Jewish before his death due to his name, and/or passed himself as Jewish in Leeds, or in the RAF.

References

External links
Burial location of Arthur Aaron Algeria
Location of Arthur Aaron's Victoria Cross Leeds City Museum
Photo of Arthur Aaron's statue in Leeds

1922 births
1943 deaths
Military personnel from Leeds
British World War II recipients of the Victoria Cross
Recipients of the Distinguished Flying Medal
Royal Air Force airmen
Royal Air Force personnel killed in World War II
Royal Air Force pilots of World War II
Royal Air Force recipients of the Victoria Cross
Royal Air Force Volunteer Reserve personnel of World War II
British World War II bomber pilots
Military personnel killed by friendly fire
People educated at Roundhay School